Lavender Hill Mob was a Canadian band that was active in the late 1970s. They released two albums on United Artists Records.

Reception 
The Los Angeles Times wrote, "Lead singer Nicky Prigeno's romantic delivery is a cross between Paul McCartney and Rupert Holmes". In February 1978, Billboard selected the single "Dream Away" as one of its recommended pop music single picks.

Albums 
 Lavender Hill Mob – released in 1977 (#76 Canada)
 Lavender Hill Mob (sometimes referred to as Street of Dreams after one of its singles) – released in 1978

Singles

Band members 
 Nicky Prigeno – Lead vocals, bass
 Ronny Jones – Vocals, lead guitar
 Gerry Hardy – Vocals, flute, 
 Chuck Chandler – Vocals, assorted keyboards and synthesizers
 Vito Fiore – Drums, percussion

References

External links 
 

Canadian rock music groups
United Artists Records artists